Frederick Augustus Conkling (August 22, 1816 – September 18, 1891) was a United States representative from New York during the American Civil War. He was also a postbellum banker, insurance company executive, and writer.

Early life
Frederick Conkling was born in Canajoharie, Montgomery County, New York.  He was one of five children born to U.S. Congressman Alfred Conkling (1789–1874) and Eliza Cockburn.  He was the elder brother of U.S. Representative and Senator Roscoe Conkling (1829–1888).

He pursued classical studies and attended The Albany Academy.

Career
He engaged in mercantile pursuits in New York City and became a member of the dry goods house of Conkling & Churchill.  He was elected as a Republican to the New York State Assembly, serving in 1854, 1859, and 1860.

Conkling was elected as a Republican over Democrat John Winthrop Chanler, in the same election cycle that elevated Abraham Lincoln as a Republican to the presidency, to the Thirty-seventh Congress, holding office from March 4, 1861, to March 3, 1863.  While in office, he was Chairman of the Ways and Means Committee.  He was an unsuccessful candidate for reelection in 1862 to the 38th United States Congress.

U.S. Civil War
In June 1861 upon the outbreak of the U.S. Civil War, Conkling organized the 84th Regiment of New York Volunteers, becoming its Colonel, and went to the front at the first call for 100-day men.  He initially served throughout the Shenandoah Valley Campaign and in 1863, his regiment was on duty as provost guard at Baltimore, Maryland.

Later career
After his defeat in Congress, he was an unsuccessful Republican candidate for mayor of New York City in 1868.  Following this loss, he changed parties, becoming first a Liberal Republican and then a Democrat, speaking highly of Horace Greeley and Gen. Winfield Scott Hancock.  He refused the Democratic nomination for Congress in his old district in 1874.

He was one of the organizers of the West Side Savings Bank of New York City and served as its president for many years; subsequently he became president of the Aetna Fire Insurance Co., of Hartford, Connecticut and served until its dissolution in 1880. He authored numerous pamphlets on political, commercial, and scientific subjects.

Personal life
Conkling was married to Eleanora Lorillard Ronalds (1825–1879), the daughter of Maria Dorothea Lorillard (1790–1848) and Thomas Alexander Ronalds (1788–1835), a New York merchant.  Eleanora was the granddaughter of Pierre Lorillard II, the head of the Lorillard Tobacco Company, and a cousin of Catharine Lorillard Wolfe.  Frederick and Eleanora were the parents of three children:

 Alfred Ronalds Conkling (1850–1917), a New York City Alderman and author who married Ethel Eastman Johnson (b. 1870), daughter of prominent painter Eastman Johnson.
 Howard Conkling (1855–1938), a noted lawyer.
 Helena Conkling.

Conkling died at his residence in New York City, 27 East 10th Street, on September 18, 1891 after a protracted illness extending over two years.  He was buried in Green-Wood Cemetery in Brooklyn.

Descendants
Through his son Alfred, he was the grandfather of Gwendolyn Lorillard Conkling, Vivien Eastman H. Conkling, and Muriel Lorillard Ronalds Conkling (1898–1971), who married Baron Louis van Reigersberg Versluys (1883–1957) of Holland in 1922.  Within one month of her wedding, her mother had married William H. Holden, and her 79-year-old grandmother had married 77 year old General Stillman F. Kneeland.

See also
Seymour-Conkling family

References

External links

Republican Party members of the New York State Assembly
Republican Party members of the United States House of Representatives from New York (state)
19th-century American politicians
People of New York (state) in the American Civil War
Union Army colonels
The Albany Academy alumni
1816 births
1891 deaths
Burials at Green-Wood Cemetery
People from Canajoharie, New York
Conkling family